Masumi Hoshino (星野 真澄, born April 4, 1984 in Saitama, Saitama) is a Japanese former professional baseball pitcher in Japan's Nippon Professional Baseball. He played with the Yomiuri Giants from 2010 to 2012. Before joining the Giants in 2010, he pitched for the Shinano Grandserows of the Baseball Challenge League.

External links

NPB stats

1984 births
Living people
Baseball people from Saitama (city)
Nippon Professional Baseball pitchers
Yomiuri Giants players
Aichi Institute of Technology alumni
Melbourne Aces players
Japanese expatriate baseball players in Australia